Sport Billy is a 1980 animated television cartoon made by Filmation Associates, initially for broadcast in Germany. The series was a single 26 episode saga that premiered in Germany and other parts of Europe from 1980 to 1981. In 1982, Filmation carried the show over to the United States for syndication, and as a summer replacement in NBC's Saturday morning children's programming. It was the last first-run series produced by Filmation Associates to air on NBC.

Overview
Sport Billy was originally a European comic character and it already had a presence in Europe and parts of Latin America. Sport Billy Productions, owners of the Sport Billy franchise, licensed the property to the American studio Filmation so it could create a cartoon based on the character. As a European character, Sport Billy's main sport was football, and this was reflected in the introductory sequence of the Filmation program.

Sport Billy was adopted by FIFA as the Fair Play Mascot for FIFA World Cups, and a trophy of the character was presented to the most sporting team at each World Cup including the 1978 Tournament. The character was internationally used as a mascot in many sporting youth programs, for the purpose of promoting sportsmanship and fair play .

The series consisted of 26 episodes. It was also shown in the UK, France, Gibraltar, Italy, Yugoslavia, Brazil, Australia, New Zealand, the Netherlands, Greece, Cyprus, Spain, Turkey, Peru, Mexico, Portugal, Romania, Czechoslovakia and some other countries. Sport Billy was voiced by Lane Scheimer, the son of producer Lou Scheimer, who voiced the Master Sports Computer and Queen Vanda's Computer. Lilly, Queen Pandusa and Queen Vanda were voiced by Joyce Bulifant, and Willy, Sporticus XI and Sipe were voiced by Frank Welker.

Synopsis
The story revolves around a young boy named Sport Billy who is from the planet Olympus (a twin of Earth on the opposite side of the Sun) which is populated by athletic god-like beings, ruled by the benevolent King Sporticus XI and his wife, Queen Pandusa. Billy himself has a magic size-changing gym bag - the Omni-Sack - which produces various tools as he needs them. He travels to Earth on a mission to promote teamwork and sportsmanship. Described by the show's theme song as a "hero from another planet", Billy battles the evil Queen Vanda and her gnome-like henchman, Sipe. Vanda's mission is to destroy all sports in the galaxy since fairness disgusts her.

Billy is assisted by two faithful companions, a girl named Lilly and a talking dog named Willy. The trio travels around in a time traveling spaceship, which is mounted on two rocket engines and resembles a giant wind-up clock, complete with a ringing bell.  In each episode the trio travels through time in order to save a different Earth sport from Queen Vanda's grasp.

Crew
 Developed by Arthur Nadel
 Writers: Paul Aratow, Paul Dini, Dan DiStefano, Barry Gaines, Jack Hanrahan, Martha Humphreys, Coslough Johnson, Ted Pedersen, Tom Ruegger

Episode list

Public service announcements
In addition to this series, there were also ten 30-second public service announcements produced by Michael Sporn Animation for syndicated TV during the general period when the series aired. These spots also taught the value of fair play and sportsmanship, but without the plot of the series.

References

External links
Sport Billy at Don Markstein's Toonopedia. Archived from the original on February 15, 2016.

1970s American animated television series
1980s American animated television series
1982 American television series debuts
1980 American television series endings
American children's animated sports television series
Animated television series about children
First-run syndicated television programs in the United States
NBC original programming
Television series by Filmation
Television series by Universal Television